Janet Waldo (born Jeanette Marie Waldo; February 4, 1919 – June 12, 2016) was an American radio and voice actress. In animation, she voiced Judy Jetson in various Hanna-Barbera media, Nancy in Shazzan, Penelope Pitstop, Princess from Battle of the Planets, and Josie in Josie and the Pussycats. On radio, she was the title character in Meet Corliss Archer.

Early life
Jeanette Marie Waldo was born in Yakima, Washington on February 4, 1919. Other birthdates were also cited, including 1918 or 1920. Her mother, Jane Althea Blodgett, was a singer trained at the Boston Conservatory of Music, and her father, Benjamin Franklin Waldo, was, according to Waldo family lore, a distant cousin of Ralph Waldo Emerson. She had three older siblings, one of whom, Elisabeth Waldo, is an authority on pre-Colombian music and an award-winning composer-violinist who appeared in the film Song of Mexico (1945). Janet attended the University of Washington, where her performance in a student theatrical garnered her an award and brought her to the attention of Bing Crosby. A Paramount Pictures talent scout, who was with Crosby at the time, signed Waldo for a screen test, which led to a contract with the studio.

Radio, films and TV

Waldo appeared in several films in uncredited bit parts and small roles, although she was the leading lady in three Westerns, two of them starring Tim Holt. Her big break came in radio with a part on Cecil B. DeMille's Lux Radio Theater. In her radio career, she lent her voice to many programs, including Edward G. Robinson's Big Town, The Eddie Bracken Show, Favorite Story, Four Star Playhouse, The Gallant Heart, One Man's Family, Sears Radio Theater, and Stars over Hollywood. She also played several characters including Joanne Allen and Mrs. Hodges on the radio show Adventures in Odyssey produced by Focus on the Family broadcasting.

She co-starred with Jimmy Lydon in the CBS situation comedy Young Love (1949–50), and she had recurring roles on The Adventures of Ozzie and Harriet (as teenager Emmy Lou), The Red Skelton Show, and People Are Funny. She recorded with jazz vocalist Mel Torme and his vocal group the Mel-Tones. Her eight-year run starring as teenager Corliss Archer on CBS's Meet Corliss Archer left a lasting impression, though Shirley Temple starred in the film adaptations, Kiss and Tell and A Kiss for Corliss. The radio program was the CBS answer to NBC's popular A Date with Judy. Despite the long run of Meet Corliss Archer, fewer than 24 episodes are known to exist. Waldo later turned down the offer to portray Corliss in a television adaptation (the role was recast with Ann Baker taking the role for TV).

In 1948, the Meet Corliss Archer comic book, using Waldo's likeness, published by Fox Feature Syndicate, appeared for a run of three issues from March to July 1948, using the original scripts.  On April 1, 1948, Waldo married playwright Robert E. Lee, the writing partner of Jerome Lawrence. The couple had two children, and remained married until his death in 1994.

Waldo made a rare on-screen television appearance when she appeared as Peggy, a teen smitten with Ricky Ricardo on a 1952 episode of I Love Lucy titled "The Young Fans" with Richard Crenna. She was 33 years old at the time.  Ten years later, Waldo again worked with Lucille Ball, this time playing Lucy Carmichael's sister, Marge, on The Lucy Show. That episode was titled "Lucy's Sister Pays A Visit.” She also appeared on an episode of The Andy Griffith Show as Amanda. Waldo also reprised the role of Emmy Lou for some early TV episodes of The Adventures of Ozzie and Harriet. Later, she was the female lead opposite Anthony Franciosa in the short-lived sitcom Valentine's Day (1964).

Animation
In television animation, she played Judy Jetson in all versions of the Hanna-Barbera television series The Jetsons. Waldo was the last surviving main cast member of the original The Jetsons series. In 1964–66, she took over the role of Pearl Slaghoople on The Flintstones, which was originally played by Verna Felton. Waldo reprised Mrs. Slaghoople on the Flintstones TV films I Yabba-Dabba Do! and Hollyrock-a-Bye Baby in the 1990s.

She later provided the voices for Nancy in Shazzan, Granny Sweet in The Atom Ant/Secret Squirrel Show, Josie in Josie and the Pussycats, and Josie and the Pussycats in Outer Space, and Penelope Pitstop in both Wacky Races and The Perils of Penelope Pitstop. She later guest-starred in Thundarr the Barbarian as Circe in the episode "Island of the Body Snatchers.”

Further guest-starring roles include Beth Crane, a descendant of Ichabod Crane, in the episode "The Headless Horseman of Halloween" from The Scooby-Doo Show in 1976 and as Aggie Wilkins/Witch McCoy in the episode "The Ozark Witch Switch" in 1977. The following year, she voiced both Arlene Wilcox, twin sister of the 'Witch of Salem' and the witch in the episode "To Switch a Witch " from the third season of Scooby Doo, Where Are You! in 1978. She voiced Morticia Addams in the short-lived 1973 cartoon series adaptation of The Addams Family. Waldo was the voice of Princess and Susan in the English-language version of Kagaku ninja tai Gatchaman, known as Battle of the Planets, and Hogatha in The Smurfs.

Later life
In 1990, shortly after completing her role as Judy Jetson in Jetsons: The Movie, she was abruptly replaced as Judy by pop star Tiffany. The executive decision of Universal Pictures caused casting director Andrea Romano to say it was "a huge mistake on so many levels" and Romano asked that her name be removed from the credits. Romano received volumes of hate mail despite her stance on the casting change. Voice director Gordon Hunt reportedly asked Tiffany to sound more like Waldo.

According to Iwao Takamoto by the time of the film's release, Tiffany's fame had waned. He quipped, "The punch line, of course, is that fifteen years after the fact, Janet Waldo is still working while for most people, saying the name Tiffany automatically brings to mind a lamp."

Ultimately, Waldo patched things up with Hanna-Barbera and continued acting on their television series. The movie version of The Jetsons was a box-office disappointment and a critical failure with most of the negative reviews directed at Tiffany's acting and the replacement of the original voice of Judy Jetson.

Personal life
Waldo married playwright Robert E. Lee in 1948, they remained married until his death in 1994. Together they had two children:  Jonathan Barlow Lee (born 1952) and Lucy V. Lee (born 1956).

Death
Waldo died on June 12, 2016, at the age of 97. She had been diagnosed with a benign but inoperable brain tumor five years before her death.

Filmography

Radio

Film

Television

Video games

References

External links
 
 Guide to the Janet Waldo Lee Papers, circa 1940s-2011: SPEC.TRI.0030 held by the Jerome Lawrence and Robert E. Lee Theatre Research Institute, The Ohio State University Libraries.

1919 births
2016 deaths
20th-century American actresses
21st-century American actresses
Actresses from Washington (state)
American voice actresses
American video game actresses
American radio actresses
American film actresses
American television actresses
Hanna-Barbera people
Paramount Pictures contract players
People from Yakima, Washington
University of Washington alumni
Burials at Forest Lawn Memorial Park (Hollywood Hills)
Age controversies
Deaths from brain tumor